The Blue Equinox, officially known as The Equinox: Volume III, Number I, is a book written by the English occultist Aleister Crowley, the founder of Thelema. First published in 1919, it details the principles and aims of the secret society O.T.O. and its ally the A∴A∴, both of which were under Crowley's control at the time. It includes such topics as The Law of Liberty, The Gnostic Mass, and Crowley's "Hymn to Pan".

Background
In 1904, Crowley was staying in Cairo, Egypt with his wife Rose when he claimed to undergo a spiritual experience.

Synopsis
The Blue Equinox opens with Crowley's poem "Hymn to Pan", a devotional work devoted to the ancient Greek deity Pan. This is followed by an editorial, in which Crowley discusses Thelema, the A∴A∴ and the O.T.O., and the important role which he believed that they had to play in the Aeon of Horus.

Hymn to Pan
Editorial 	
Præmonstrance of A∴A∴ 	
Curriculum of A∴A∴ 	
Liber II [The Message of the Master Therion]
The Tent 	
Liber DCCCXXXVII [The Law of Liberty]
Liber LXI [vel Causae A∴A∴]
A Psalm 	
Liber LXV [Liber Cordis Cincti Serpente]
Liber CL [De Lege Libellum]
A Psalm
Liber CLXV [A Master of the Temple]
Liber CCC [Khabs am Pekht]
Stepping Out of the Old Aeon into the New 	
The Seven Fold Sacrament 	
Liber LII [Manifesto of the O.T.O.]
Liber CI [An Open Letter to Those Who May Wish to Join the Order]
Liber CLXI [Concerning the Law of Thelema]
Liber CXCIV [An Intimation with Reference to the Constitution of the Order]
Liber XV (The Gnostic Mass)
Nekam Adonai!
A La Loge
The Tank
Special Supplement: Liber LXXI [The Voice of the Silence: The Two Paths, The Seven Portals]

References

Footnotes

Bibliography
Academic books and papers

External links
The Blue Equinox full text of the book
Full text of The Law of Liberty

1919 non-fiction books
Thelemite texts
Works by Aleister Crowley